Vale do Açu is a microregion in the Brazilian state of Rio Grande do Norte.

Municipalities 
The microregion consists of the following municipalities:
 Alto do Rodrigues
 Assu
 Carnaubais
 Ipanguaçu
 Itajá
 Jucurutu
 Pendências
 Porto do Mangue
 São Rafael

References

Microregions of Rio Grande do Norte